The Siemens Asiarunner locomotives are contemporaries to the Eurorunner class and are designed specifically for the South-East Asian market - in particular metre gauge - key features are a Co'Co' wheel arrangement (resulting in low axle loads) and good clearance (see Loading gauge)

Development

Much of the development of the Asiarunner locomotive had to be done from scratch, since Siemens had no contemporary example of a narrow gauge, or of a locomotive that was built to a smaller loading gauge that UIC 505-1.

Nevertheless, the design mirrors in part the modular concept found in Siemens other locomotives (the Eurosprinter and Eurorunner). The main frame is one such module. The drivers cabins are also modular components.

Access to the main engine compartment is via the roof, which has three removable segments, there is a single side corridor which allows an escape route in the event of certain emergencies (compare the wide gauge Eurorunners which have two passageways)

The engine is a 12-cylinder MTU model - similar to that used in the Eurorunner except with 12 instead of 16 cylinders.

The locos can work in multiple with up to three connected.

Operators 

Whilst the Asiarunner was designed for use in Asia, Africa, South America and Australia, its only operator is Vietnam Railways, with 16 AR15s running passenger and freight services on its Hanoi – Da Nang – Ho Chi Minh City route.

See also 
 Siemens Eurorunner
 Siemens Eurosprinter
 Narrow gauge railways
 Rail transport in Vietnam

References

External links

 

Images

Siemens locomotives
Diesel locomotives of Vietnam
Co′Co′ locomotives